The following is a list of Pashto-language films:

Highest grossing films 
Top 10 highest-grossing Pashto films of all time.

1970s

2000s 
Son of a Lion (2007)

See also 
List of Pashto-language films of 2017
List of Pashto-language films of 2018

References

External links 
 Search Pashto Films IMDb.com

Pashto
Pashto